The Pemberton Volcanic Belt is an eroded Oligocene-Miocene volcanic belt at a low angle near the Mount Meager massif, British Columbia, Canada. The Garibaldi and Pemberton volcanic belts appear to merge into a single belt, although the Pemberton is older than the Garibaldi Volcanic Belt. The Pemberton Volcanic Belt is one of the geological formations comprising the Canadian Cascade Arc. It formed as a result of subduction of the former Farallon Plate.

Features

Features within the Pemberton Belt include:
Mount Barr Plutonic Complex
Mount Barr 
Chilliwack batholith 
Slesse Mountain
Chipmunk Mountain 
Coquihalla Mountain 
Crevasse Crag
Franklin Glacier Complex
Salal Creek Pluton
Silverthrone Caldera

See also
Garibaldi Volcanic Belt
Geology of the Pacific Northwest
Cascade Volcanoes
Volcanism of Canada
Volcanism of Western Canada

References
 Canada Volcanoes and Volcanics USGS

 
Volcanic belts
Miocene volcanism
Oligocene volcanism
Subduction volcanoes
Miocene Canada
Oligocene North America
Paleogene Canada